Hoosier most commonly refers to a person from the U.S. state of Indiana, known as The Hoosier State.

Hoosier may also refer to:

Places

Canada
 Hoosier, Saskatchewan

United States
 Hoosier, Illinois
 Hoosier, Indiana
 Hoosier, Wisconsin
 Hoosier Creek, in Iowa
 Hoosier Pass (disambiguation)
 Hoosier Township (disambiguation)

Other
 Hoosier (1851 sidewheeler), a steamboat on the Willamette River in Oregon
 Hoosiers (film), a 1986 sports film
 Hoosier (train) (1911–1959)
 Hoosier Bearcat, nickname of Ernest Cutler Price (1891–1942), American boxer
 The Hoosiers, a band from the United Kingdom
 Indiana Hoosiers, the sports teams and players of Indiana University Bloomington
 Hoosier Racing Tire, a tire manufacturer

See also
 
 Hosier
 Hooser
 Hoser
 Hoosierville, Indiana